Events in the year 1556 in India.

Events
 14 February – at the age of 13 Akbar becomes the emperor of Mughal India
 7 October – Hemu, the Chief Minister and general of Adil Shah Suri defeats the Mughals in the Battle of Tughlaqabad and captures Delhi.
 5 November – The Mughals defeat Hemu in the Second Battle of Panipat and recapture Delhi.

Births
 17 December – Abdul Rahim Khan-I-Khana poet (died 1627)
 Ibrahim Adil Shah II, later king of Bijapur Sultanate (died 1627)

Deaths
 1 January – Humayun of Mughal India (born 1508)

See also